Mönichkirchen is a market town in the district of Neunkirchen in the south of the Austrian state of Lower Austria with a population of 607 inhabitants (1.1.2013).

Geography 
Mönichkirchen is situated on the east side of the Wechsel mountain (1,743 m) in the south-east Industrieviertel near the border with Styria. The size of the village is 16.27 km². 68.34% of the area is forested.

Population

Sports  

There are two sports clubs in Mönichkirchen:
 Winter sports club Mönichkirchen
 Soccer club FC Mönichkirchen
Around the village of Mönichkirchen there is a skiing resort that is joined by several lifts to the adjacent skiing resort of Mariensee (village of Aspangberg-Sankt Peter). The total length of ski-slopes of both resorts is about 13 km. Both villages operate three chair lifts and one drag lift.
During summer the region is commonly used for hiking and climbing.

References

Cities and towns in Neunkirchen District, Austria
Prealps East of the Mur